Winterberg is a village in the municipality of Lindau in Pfäffikon District, canton of Zürich in Switzerland.

Its coat of arms is a blazon: three times six piled balls in a triangle

Geography 

The locality Winterberg is the topographically highest township of Lindau. There some traditional farmers in the village, and in the early 1930s the first one-family houses were built. Until today the building activity has been continued on a moderate speed.

Population 
Winterberg as of 1 January 2016 has a population of 902 people, who mainly live in owner-occupied houses.

Sources 
www.lindau.ch

References 
 *

Villages in the canton of Zürich